Kušernik is a small settlement in the Municipality of Pesnica in northeastern Slovenia. It lies in the Slovene Hills, part of the traditional region of Styria. The municipality is now included in the Drava Statistical Region.

A small roadside chapel-shrine in the settlement dates to 1909.

References

External links
Kušernik on Geopedia

Populated places in the Municipality of Pesnica